Hae may refer to:

People 
 Hae Phoofolo, interim Prime Minister of Lesotho

Other uses 
 Hae (letter), a Georgian letter
 Height above ellipsoid, a measure of elevation or altitude
 Hereditary angioedema, a rare disease
 Hepatic artery embolization, a method to treat liver tumors
 Hire Association Europe, a trade association
 Human Arts Ensemble, a 1970s musical collective from St. Louis, Missouri
 Eastern Oromo language (ISO 639 code: hae), an Ethiopian language
 Haemonetics (NYSE stock ticker HAE), a blood and plasma company
 Hannibal Regional Airport (FAA LID: HAE), an airport in Missouri, United States
 Hanover-Altenbeken Railway Company, a nineteenth-century German railway company

See also 
 Hay (disambiguation)
 Hey (disambiguation)